Moosewood may refer to:

Acer pensylvanicum, a species of maple known variously as striped maple, moosewood and moose maple
Viburnum lantanoides, a species of shrub in the family Caprifoliaceae
Dirca, a genus of deciduous shrubs in the family Thymelaeaceae, known variously as leatherwood, moosewood, ropebark and wicopy
Moosewood Cookbook, a cookbook authored by Mollie Katzen
Moosewood Restaurant, a restaurant in Ithaca, New York, United States